NGC 6604 is a young open cluster of stars in the equatorial constellation of Serpens, positioned about 1.5° north of the Eagle Nebula (NGC 6611). The cluster was discovered by William Herschel on July 15, 1784. NGC 6604 forms the densest part of the Ser OB2 association of co-moving stars.

This cluster is fairly compact with a Trumpler class of I3p, and is still undergoing star formation. It lies at the heart of an H II region with the identifier S54, and the two are most likely linked. The cluster has an estimated age of 6.5 million years and contains several massive stars of the OB type. One of these is the high mass triple star system HD 167971, which includes the over-contact eclipsing binary MY Ser. It is one of the most luminous stars in the galaxy. HD 168112 is another colliding-wind binary in the cluster; both systems are over-luminous in their X-ray emission.

References

External links
 

Open clusters
6604
Serpens (constellation)